A lap is the area on top of the thighs of a sitting person.

Lap
Lap may also refer to:

 One circuit in a speed sport, e.g. around a race track or swimming pool
 Lapping or "to lap", an abrasive machining process
 Lap joint, a technique for joining two materials
 Laps, Puy-de-Dôme, France

People with surname Lap:

 Geert Lap (born 1951), Dutch ceramist

LAP
LAP may refer to:

 Los Angeles Pacific Railroad
 Manuel Márquez de León International Airport, IATA code
 La Plata (Amtrak station), Missouri, USA (Amtrak code)
 Lambert Academic Publishing, a publishing house of the VDM Group
 Latency-associated peptide, associated with tumors
 Leukocyte alkaline phosphatase, in white blood cells
 Language/action perspective, a computational paradigm
 Líneas Aéreas Paraguayas, initials and ICAO code of the former national airline of Paraguay
 Linhas Aéreas Paulistas – LAP, former Brazilian airline
 Lima Airport Partners, operator of the airport in Peru 
 Limiting absorption principle, a concept in Spectral Theory (Mathematics)
 Luzenac Ariège Pyrénées, a French association football team
 Light-addressable potentiometric sensor, light sensor technology

Other
 Lanthanum phosphide, a chemical compound with the formula LaP

See also

 
 
 
 
 Lapp (disambiguation)
 llap (disambiguation)
 IAP (disambiguation)

tr:Tur